Albert Ritserveldt (13 October 1915 – 11 March 2002) was a Belgian racing cyclist. He won the 1939 edition of the Liège–Bastogne–Liège.

References

External links

1915 births
2002 deaths
Belgian male cyclists
Cyclists from East Flanders
People from Geraardsbergen